Christian Dean DiMarco (born August 23, 1968) is an American professional golfer who plays on the PGA Tour Champions. DiMarco has won seven tournaments as a pro, including three PGA Tour events.

Early years
Born in Huntington, New York, DiMarco moved to Florida with his family at age seven.  He attended Lake Brantley High School in Altamonte Springs, where he played for the Patriots golf team and began dating his future wife at the age of 17.  DiMarco was raised in a sports-oriented family; both of his older brothers were athletes, and his father played college basketball for St. John's University. DiMarco's nephew Patrick DiMarco is a professional football player.

College career
DiMarco accepted an athletic scholarship to the University of Florida in Gainesville, where he played for coach Lynn Blevins and coach Buddy Alexander's Gator golf teams  from 1987 to 1990.  He shot a three-round score of 209 to win the Southeastern Conference (SEC) individual title in 1989, while leading the Gators to an SEC team championship.  He also was a seven-time medalist, a first-team All-SEC selection in 1989 and 1990, the SEC Player of the Year in 1990, and an All-American in 1988, 1989 and 1990.  DiMarco was inducted into the University of Florida Athletic Hall of Fame as a "Gator Great" in 2002.

Professional career
DiMarco turned professional in 1990, won the Canadian Tour's Order of Merit as its money leader in 1992, and finished ninth on the second-tier Nike Tour in 1993 to earn his PGA Tour card for 1994.  However, he was not always able to maintain his place on the PGA Tour, and he won his first professional tournament on the Nike Tour at the 1997 Nike Ozarks Open. As he moved into his 30s, he continued to improve, capturing his first trophy on the PGA Tour at the 2000 SEI Pennsylvania Classic.

His second PGA Tour victory was the 2001 Buick Challenge, where he sank a  birdie on the 18th hole to tie leader David Duval, and then won on the first hole of a sudden death playoff.  He won his third PGA Tour event at the 2002 Phoenix Open, which featured an infamous moment—as DiMarco was addressing a pressure putt at TPC Scottsdale's 16th hole, one of the fans yelled "Noonan!" (a reference from the movie Caddyshack).  DiMarco maintained his concentration and sank the putt, then pointed at the fan and demanded that a tournament official eject him.  By 2004, he had finished in the top twenty on the PGA Tour money list for five straight seasons, and had tied for second in the PGA Championship, losing the title to Vijay Singh in a three-way playoff.

In 2005, DiMarco lost a sudden-death playoff with Tiger Woods to finish second in The Masters. The final round pairing of Woods and DiMarco featured a famous chip from Woods which took an incredibly long time to drop into the hole for a birdie on the par three 16th, and stretch his lead to two. The Masters result moved DiMarco into the top ten of the Official World Golf Rankings. DiMarco finished as the runner-up in a major for the third time at the 2006 Open Championship at Hoylake; Tiger Woods beating him by two strokes.  DiMarco achieved his four-round score of 70-65-69-68 (272, −16) less than three weeks after the death of his mother.

Arguably, DiMarco enjoyed his most consistent success from 2002 to 2006, when he was ranked in the top ten of the world rankings for 61 weeks, going as high as number six in the world in 2005.  DiMarco was also a member of the U.S. national team in the 2003 and 2005 Presidents Cup, and the Ryder Cup competitions in 2004 and 2006.  DiMarco sank a  putt to beat Stuart Appleby and clinch the 2005 Presidents Cup.

In 2007, he disclosed that he was suffering from a chronic shoulder injury, and underwent arthroscopic surgery on his left shoulder later that year.  Notwithstanding the injury, DiMarco still finished among the top 25 in six tournaments and earned more than $950,000 in fewer than nine months in 2007.

DiMarco has not played a full PGA Tour schedule since 2012. He is a frequent contributor to Morning Drive  on Golf Channel.

Personal life
DiMarco has known his wife Amy (née Curtis) since the seventh grade, when both attended Rock Lake Middle School in Longwood.  Later, both were students at Lake Brantley High School, and attended their high school prom together.  They have three children—two daughters and a son. His son, Cristian DiMarco, was a member of the University of South Florida golf team, after transferring from Kentucky. Cristian turned professional in 2018.

DiMarco hosts his own annual charity golf tournament at his local course, Heathrow Country Club in Heathrow, Florida.  The "Norma DiMarco Tee Up For Life Golf Tournament" is named in honor of his mother, who died from cancer in 2006. It raises funds for R.O.C.K (Reaching Out to Cancer Kids), and features celebrities and amateurs.  As part of his personal participation in the event, DiMarco plays the 12th hole with every foursome in the tournament.

Amateur wins
1988 Monroe Invitational, Western Amateur

Professional wins (8)

PGA Tour wins (3)

PGA Tour playoff record (1–2)

European Tour wins (1)

European Tour playoff record (0–2)

Nike Tour wins (1)

*Note: The 1997 Nike Ozarks Open was shortened to 54 holes due to weather.

Nike Tour playoff record (0–1)

Canadian Tour wins (1)

Other wins (2)

Other playoff record (1–0)

Results in major championships 

WD = withdrew
CUT = missed the half-way cut
"T" = tied for place

Summary

Most consecutive cuts made – 9 (2000 PGA – 2002 PGA)
Longest streak of top-10s – 2 (twice)

Results in The Players Championship

CUT = missed the halfway cut
"T" indicates a tie for a place

Results in World Golf Championships

1Cancelled due to 9/11

QF, R16, R32, R64 = Round in which player lost in match play
"T" = tied
NT = No Tournament

Results in senior major championships

"T" indicates a tie for a place
CUT = missed the halfway cut
NT = No tournament due to COVID-19 pandemic

U.S. national team appearances
Professional
Presidents Cup: 2003 (tie), 2005 (winners)
Ryder Cup: 2004, 2006
Wendy's 3-Tour Challenge (representing PGA Tour): 2007

See also 

1993 Nike Tour graduates
1997 Nike Tour graduates
List of American Ryder Cup golfers
List of Florida Gators men's golfers on the PGA Tour
List of University of Florida Athletic Hall of Fame members

References

External links 

Tee Up For Life Golf Tournament – Official webpage for DiMarco's annual charity tournament.
Golf Channel – Chris DiMarco

American male golfers
Florida Gators men's golfers
PGA Tour golfers
PGA Tour Champions golfers
Ryder Cup competitors for the United States
Korn Ferry Tour graduates
Golfers from New York (state)
Golfers from Orlando, Florida
American people of Italian descent
Lake Brantley High School alumni
People from Huntington, New York
People from Heathrow, Florida
People from Altamonte Springs, Florida
1968 births
Living people